Kelly & Duke was a daily and Sunday comic strip drawn and written by Jack Moore and syndicated by Universal Press Syndicate. It began on July 10, 1972, then known as Kelly, but changed to the Kelly & Duke title on December 8, 1974. It ended on June 18, 1980.

The strip centers on a boy named Kelly, whose pet and best friend is Duke, an anthropomorphic dog with a Southern accent. The strip's cast was made up with Roscoe, a beatnik cat.

There were no book collections of Kelly and Duke, although a children's book based on the strip, What is God's Area Code?, was published in 1974 as part of the Cartoon Stories for the New Children.

Sources

American comic strips
1972 comics debuts
1980 comics endings
Comics characters introduced in 1972
Child characters in comics
Comic strip duos
Anthropomorphic dogs
Comics about dogs
Gag-a-day comics